Timothy O'Connor (1 October 1906 – 21 July 1986) was an Irish Fianna Fáil politician who served as a Teachta Dála (TD) for the Kerry South constituency from 1961 to 1981. 

A businessman from Killorglin, he was first elected to Dáil Éireann as a Fianna Fáil TD for the Kerry South constituency at the 1961 general election. He was re-elected at each subsequent general election until he lost his seat at the 1981 general election when he was defeated by Labour's Michael Moynihan. He stood unsuccessfully at the 1979 European Parliament election for the Munster constituency. He was also a member of Kerry County Council for many years, representing the Killorglin local electoral area.

References

1906 births
1986 deaths
Fianna Fáil TDs
Members of the 17th Dáil
Members of the 18th Dáil
Members of the 19th Dáil
Members of the 20th Dáil
Members of the 21st Dáil
People educated at St Munchin's College